The Atlanta Junior Chamber is an organization of young professionals ages 21–40 that provides a wide range of professional and personal development activities. Members can participate in community service, business networking, leadership development, and social events. The Atlanta Junior Chamber is a non-profit corporation as described under IRS Code 501(C)(4).

The organization was established in April 1921 by John L. Westmoreland, an Atlanta attorney, and was the first Junior Chamber in Georgia to charter and affiliate with the United States Junior Chamber (Jaycees) and is currently one of the oldest, continually active chapters in the national organization.

The Atlanta Junior Chamber has played an active leadership role in the City of Atlanta and the State of Georgia for almost 90 years. The organization played a leading role in the creation of the Georgia Junior Chamber and the Florida Junior Chamber and has sponsored the establishment of numerous Junior Chambers throughout the metro area.

Atlanta Junior Chamber mission and history

Mission
To positively impact the Atlanta community by providing young professionals opportunities for networking, community involvement and leadership advancement.

History

Developing the Atlanta community.

From its inception, the Atlanta Jaycees became concerned with almost every type of project which would serve the needs of Atlanta. The Atlanta Jaycees played a significant role in establishing Atlanta as the southern terminus of the airmail route in the eastern corridor of the United States.

The eastern corridor stretched from New York to Florida. In understanding how common flying is now, we lose sight of the fact that competition in the airline industry was fierce, for it meant a new economy coming to an industry-starved section of the country. In 1926, the Atlanta Jaycees sponsored a special airmail flight between Atlanta and New York City in order to encourage the government to establish a regular air route between the two cities. The Atlanta Jaycees were also involved in organizing a group of citizens who posted beacons in the night so that pilots could see to safely fly into the city. These efforts were critical in establishing Atlanta as the southern terminus for airmail delivery and helped establish Atlanta as the premier city in the southeast.

In the 1970s, the Atlanta Junior Chamber recognized that the future growth of Atlanta would require an improved transportation system. With the financial and political support of Past President Clifford Oxford, the Atlanta Junior Chamber initiated a campaign to establish the Metropolitan Atlanta Rapid Transit Authority.

Community service

In 1931, the Atlanta Jaycees joined the Atlanta Georgian (a Hearst newspaper that merged with the Atlanta Journal in 1939) and fused their efforts in the Atlanta Empty Stocking Fund begun by Georgian Editor James B. Nevin in 1927. In 1939 it became the Atlanta Jaycee Journal-Constitution Empty Stocking Fund, Inc. The program has now become the largest of its type in the United States. In 1997, the Atlanta Jaycees and the Atlanta Journal-Constitution ceded control of the charity to a community board of directors and a professional staff in an effort to ensure that the service provided would continue to expand within the Atlanta community. At the high point of the Junior Chamber’s role in managing this charity (1994–95), the Empty Stocking Fund purchased toys for 80,000 children by raising well over $1,000,000.

While ESF was the largest and best known service project, the Atlanta Jaycees did not limit programming activities to just ESF. The Atlanta Jaycees service tradition extends to actively supporting the establishment of the Hugh O'Brien Youth Leadership Foundation in Georgia, building houses through Habitat for Humanity, establishing the Bedford-Pine Boy's Club in 1968, and operating of the Summer hill Little Street Community Center.

This tradition continues with chapter's dedication finding a cure for childhood cancer research through its annual support of St. Baldrick's Day. Since assuming the lead for this effort in Atlanta, the chapter has raised in excess of $175,000 for this charity over the past three years. In 2007, the chapter projects to raise over $80,000 and exceed $250,000 in total fund raised for the first four years of the project.

Social justice

In the 1950s the Atlanta Jaycees, under the leadership of Clifford Oxford, led a legislative drive to require the Ku Klux Klan to unmask in public. This successful legislative effort was recognized as instrumental in weakening the KKK in Georgia. As a result of these efforts, in 1953, Clifford Oxford was recognized as Atlanta's Young Man of the Year and one of Time Magazine's 100 Leaders of Tomorrow.

The 1960s saw a continuation of the Atlanta Jaycees civil rights involvement with the desegregation of the chapter in 1966-67 under the leadership of Ivan Allen III. The chapter demonstrated its commitment to desegregation at the local and state level by seating African-American chapter members as delegates to the Annual Meeting of the Georgia Junior Chamber of Commerce in 1967.

In 1977-78, the chapter voted to implement a pilot plan adopted by the U.S. Jaycees, under which young women were permitted to join. Atlanta was the only chapter in Georgia allowed to participate in the pilot project, and this involvement eventually led to the inclusion of women in Junior Chambers nationwide. These efforts were quite controversial in Georgia and resulted in an unsuccessful attempt to revoke the Junior Chamber charter from the Atlanta chapter. In response to these attacks, the chapter established a separate corporate identify, the Atlanta Junior Association of Commerce and Industry, Inc., in 1979.  While the admission of women into the Jaycees was resolved in 1984 following the Supreme Court's decision in Roberts v. United States Jaycees the chapter maintained this alternate corporate identity for an additional 5-year period to ensure that the issue was completely resolved nationally.

National and international meetings

In 1955, the Atlanta Jaycees hosted its first US Junior Chamber National Convention. The Atlanta Jaycees helped convince the rest of the United States that Atlanta is a great convention city. The success of the 1955 meeting laid the groundwork for the US Jaycees to return to Atlanta in 1961, 1972, and again in 1984. The 1972 convention is remembered by the U.S. Jaycees as the first time over 12,000 Jaycees attended a national convention. The 1984 convention represented another significant milestone in the history of the Junior Chamber in that this convention was the first to officially admit women as full members of the organization. The Atlanta Junior Chamber’s role in uniting young leaders from around the country was expanded in 1999 when the chapter was named the host city for the Junior Chamber International's Area C Conference in 2001. This conference, the largest Area C meeting to date, brought 750 Jaycees from 40 countries together in Atlanta. The tradition of bringing young leaders together will continue in 2007 when the chapter hosts the US Junior Chamber Met-Net conference, a meeting designed for Junior Chambers in metro communities around the world.

Recent history

The chapter programming during the 1990s focused primarily on fundraising, membership and the Empty Stocking Fund. In 1994, the chapter reached a modern-day high point for membership with 380 members and was recognized as the top chapter in the Georgia Jaycee organization. The strength of the chapter's leadership training was demonstrated in 1993 when Tricia (Evert) Welsh was elected Georgia Jaycee State President - the 5th Atlanta Jaycee to hold that office and the first since 1981. In 1994, Tricia was elected US Junior Chamber National Vice President - only the 2nd Atlanta Jaycee to hold this office.   The 1994 year represented high-water marks for chapter and charitable fundraising efforts with members raising over $30,000 for the chapter and in excess of $1 million for local charities.

In addition to these achievements, the role of women and minorities continued to expand within the chapter - a reflection of the growing diversity within the Atlanta community. Since 1990, the chapter has elected 7 women as Local President - representing a 3 fold increase in the number of female local presidents since the chapter was founded in 1921. While impressive, the true impact of female leadership was seen at the board level where the majority of officers and directors leading the chapter have been women.

Further, as the Atlanta population diversified so did the chapter membership. This increasing chapter diversity was bolstered by the election of the chapter's first Vietnamese-American local president in 1995 and the chapter’s for first Peruvian-American local president in 2002. Atlanta also hosted the Junior Chamber International’s Area C meeting and has taken a more active role in leading the US Junior Chamber with individual members serving as the National Legal Counsel and Southeast Metro Area Director in 2006 and 2007 respectively.

The chapter today

Under the leadership of Adrian Marshall, the chapter continues to provide the community of Atlanta with leadership training through community service. The signature community event for the chapter is the annual  St. Baldrick's Day fundraiser that raises money to support childhood cancer research. Leading the fundraising efforts in Atlanta, the chapter has raised in excess of $500,000 for this charity since 2003.

In 2012, under the leadership of Gary Marshall, the chapter finished number one in the nation for membership growth, growing by 234%. The state of Georgia also finished as the number one state in the nation in 2012.

In 2012, the Atlanta Jaycees were honored to have member Jessica Black named as one of the JCI's 2012 Ten Outstanding Young Americans (TOYA). Every year the U.S. Junior Chamber dedicates an evening at the annual meeting to celebrate several top outstanding young Americans. These individuals exemplify the organization’s mission: to provide development opportunities that empower young people to create positive change. These honorees have taken initiative to address needs in their communities and around the world. However, they did not stop there, pushing onward from initial success onto bigger impact. They show the power of young people to create positive change. Noted past recipients of this award include Elvis Presley, John F. Kennedy, Richard Nixon, Orson Welles and Christopher Reed.

The chapter today has approximately 100 members representing a wide variety of educational and professional interests. Members continue to build on its 90+ years of service to the Atlanta community by providing young professionals the opportunity to participate in community service, business networking, leadership development, educational advancement and social events. The chapter's focus remains on its local members and leadership development as it strives to support the legacy established by former members, including the late Senator Paul Coverdell and the late Mayor Maynard Jackson.

Current chapter leadership

Jordan Suresky – President
Michelle Kim – Chairman of the Board / immediate past president
Michelle Kim – Executive Vice President
Chelsea Yearous - Events VP
Jordan Suresky - International Relations
Megan Harrison – Treasurer

Junior Chamber creed

The author of the Jaycee Creed was C. William Brownfield. The Creed was adopted by the Junior Chamber International in 1946 and the United States Junior Chamber in 1947. The original version of the Creed did not include a reference to faith in God. This reference was not added until 1951.

We Believe:

That faith in God gives meaning and purpose to human life; 
That the brotherhood of man transcends the sovereignty of nations; 
That economic justice can best be won by free men through free enterprise; 
That government should be of laws rather than of men; 
That earth's great treasure lies in human personality; 
And that service to humanity is the best work of life.

Atlanta Junior Chamber local presidents

John L. Westmoreland – 1921 – Charter member; US Junior Chamber Director
Eugene Oberdorfer  - 1922 – Charter member
Rayburn Blackborn  - 1923 – Charter member
Roy LeCraw  - 1924 – Charter member
John M Slaton, Jr.   - 1925 – Charter member
Fitzhugh Knox, Jr.   - 1926 – Charter member
Herbert B. Kenney  - 1927
Baxter Maddox  - 1928 – GA Junior Chamber President
Jonathon Woody  - 1929
Joe W. Ray  - 1930
Frank K. Shaw  - 1931
Rayford W. Tharpe  - 1932
Duncan G. Peek  - 1933
Clifford Hendrix  - 1934 – GA Junior Chamber President
Everett G. Jackson  - 1935
J.B. Couch  - 1936
F. Dade Kelley  - 1937
William A. Horne, Jr  - 1938
Herbert B. Hayes    - 1939
Vernon S. Brown  - 1940
John L. Parks  - 1940
O.C. Hubert  - 1941
Fred Sington    - 1942
R.W. Schilling  - 1943
Donald L. Moore  - 1944
B.L. Brown  - 1945
Dan C. Flinn  - 1946
W. Lee Burge  - 1947
Sidney Haskins  - 1948
Hamilton Douglas, Jr.  - 1949
Clifford Oxford  - 1950
Irving K. Kaler  - 1950
Joseph A. Wyant  - 1951
Charles H. Smith  - 1952
Harold J. Salfen  - 1953 – US Junior Chamber Vice President; GA Junior Chamber President
Stewart Wright  - 1954
DeJongh Franklin  - 1955
John H. Thurman  - 1956
Robert L. Marchman, II  - 1957
L. Douglas Cook, Jr.   - 1958
Daniel C. Kyker  - 1959
Dom Wyant - 1960
James B. Pilcher  - 1961
Lamar Sheets  - 1962
OK Sheffield – 1963
William A. Frankel  - 1964
Sam Buckmaster, Jr.   - 1965
Ivan Allen, III  - 1966
W. Jim Goldin  - 1967
Claude H. Grizzard  - 1968
James R. Cleveland  - 1969
William Walton  - 1970
Talbot C. Bryant, Jr.   - 1971
Thomas D. Hills  - 1972
James Breedlove  - 1973
J. Stephen Black  - 1974
James V. Manning  - 1975
Robert E. Price  - 1976
Atlee O. Harmon, Jr.   - 1977
John L. Johnson  - 1978
Jim Lovejoy  - 1979
Ronald L. Thomas  - 1980
Leon Wheeler  - 1981 – GA Junior Chamber President
Robert Melson  - 1982
Daniel B. Amaker  - 1983
Bruce H. Gaynes  - 1984
Gary Saddler  - 1985
Amye Reece-Shelton  - 1986
Chris M. Parlontieri  - 1987
Seashols N. Starks  - 1988
Robert L Cox, Jr.   - 1989
Tricia (Evert) Welsh  - 1990 – US Junior Chamber Vice President; GA Junior Chamber President
Larry Hilsmier  - 1991
Lisa Brattin  - 1992
Chuck Zimmerman  - 1993
Sal Lucido  - 1994– US Junior Chamber Legal Counsel
David Nguyen  - 1995
Mike Neff  - 1996
Matt Lupo  - 1997
Sarah Sledge  - 1998
Martin Dekom  - 1999
Margaret Stewart   - 1999
John Pamplin  - 2000
Carol Kennemore  - 2001
Tania Lopez  - 2002
Justin Seymour  - 2003
Michael Waldrep  - 2004
Lara Stegman  - 2005
Michael DiLonardo  - 2006– US Junior Chamber Southeast Metro Director
Phillip Minnes  - 2007 - US Junior Chamber Southeast Metro Director
Ben Hester  - 2008
Dan Lack  - 2009
George Jaramillo - 2010
Kathryn Powell - 2011
Gary Marshall - 2012
Trevor Smith - 2013
Tunç Kip - 2014
Chris Williams - 2015
Brandt Wilson - 2016
Adrian Marshall - 2017
Michelle Kim-2018
Jordan Suresky-2019

Honorary life members
Mr. Austin Abbott
Mr. William B Hartsfield
Mr. Harrison Jones
Mr. Frank Neely
Mr. A.L. Zachry
Dr. Allen D. Albert Jr.
Mrs. Dany Byrd
Mr. Mills B. Lane, Jr.
Mr. Fain Peek
Mr. Robert S. Lynch
Mr. H.O. Smith
Mr. Fred B. Moore
Mr. Richard H Rich
Mr. James V. Carmichael
Mr. Abe Goldstein
Mr. Obey T. Brewer, Sr.
Mr. Edgar J. Forio
Mr. Robert R. Snodgrass
Mr. Granger Hansell
Mr. A.L. Feldman
Mr. Fred J. Turner
Mr. Ivan Allen, Sr.
Mr. Hughes Spaulding, SR
Mr. John A. Sibley
Dr. Lee Brown
Mr. Robert Strickland
Mr. Danny Betz
Mr. John Sibley
Mr. Robert T. Maddox
Mr. Ivan Allen Jr.
Mr. Ben S. Gilmer
Mr. Edward Smith
Mr. Joseph Sheehan
Mr. John J. McDonough
Mr. J. Pollard Turman
Mr. Rawson Haverty
Mr. Denny Betz
Dr. Noah Langdale
Dr. John W. Letson
Mr. I.M. Sheffield
Mr. Albert J. Bows
Mr. W. Smythe Gambrell
Mr. Gordon Jones
Mr. Dillard Munford
Mr. Thomas G. Cousins
Mr. A.B. Padgett
Mr. Robert Woodruff
Mr. Jaspar Dorsey
Mr. Jesse Hill
Mr. Ben Fortson
Mr. Herman Talmadge
Dr. Lee Brown
Mr. Alan F. Goodelman
Mr. Hollis Harris
Mr. Nathaniel C. Harrison

Notable Atlanta Jaycees
Tarby Bryant - CEO - Sweetwater Capital Corporation
W. Lee Burge - Chairman & CEO (ret.) - Equifax
James Cleveland - CEO - Cleveland Electric Company
Paul Coverdell - US Senator (1993–2000)
Claude H. Grizzard - Chairman Emeritus - Grizzard Communications Group
Rawson Haverty, Sr. - former CEO -Haverty Furniture - Bronze Star Recipient (US Army)
Thomas D. Hills - Chief Financial Officer - State of Georgia
O.C. Hubert - Founder - Hubert Foundation
Maynard Jackson - Mayor of Atlanta (1974–1982) & (1990–1994)
Roy LeCraw  - Mayor of Atlanta (1941) - Bronze Star Recipient (US Army)
James V. Manning - Board of Directors - WebMD
Robert Melson - Senior Pastor - Dodd-Sterling UMC
Guy W. Milner - Founder & former CEO - Norrell Corporation
Jessica Black - 2010 Miss United States - Director at Premier Logic

JCI Senators from Atlanta
Tricia (Evert) Welsh - JCI Senator 51952
Sal Lucido - JCI Senator 66512
Phil Minnes - JCI Senator 72027

Georgia Jaycee Honor Corp from Atlanta
Leonard Goodelman - Colonel 1815 - Life Member 24 - CEO Affordable Photography Inc.
Sal Lucido - Colonel 2299
Tricia Evert Welsh - Colonel 2113

See also
Junior Chamber International
United States Junior Chamber
List of civic, fraternal, service, and professional organizations

References

Affiliations
Junior Chamber International
U.S. Jaycees Metro Conference
United States Junior Chamber

Organizations established in 1921
Service organizations based in the United States

Organizations based in Atlanta
1921 establishments in Georgia (U.S. state)